The 1984 Pot Black was the sixteenth edition of the professional invitational snooker tournament, which took place between 28 and 30 December 1983 but was broadcast in the summer of 1984. The tournament was held at Pebble Mill Studios in Birmingham. For the first time since the inaugural tournament in 1969, the championship was reverted to a knockout format and players risen from 8 to 16. This change was made at the request of the players, who asked for a competition, in which more of them could take part. All matches until the final were one-frame shoot-outs, the final being contested over the best of three frames.

Broadcasts were on BBC2 and started at 21:00 on Wednesday 4 January 1984  Alan Weeks presented the programme with Ted Lowe as commentator and John Williams as referee.

With the tournament now risen to 16 players, there were Pot Black debuts for Tony Meo, Silvino Francisco and Mark Wildman and original player John Spencer played for the first time since 1980.
Terry Griffiths who also last played in 1980 won the event, his ninth professional title, beating Spencer 2–1 in the final.

Main draw

Final

References

Pot Black
Pot Black
Pot Black
Pot Black